The Paraguayan Civil War may refer to three conflicts:

1911 Paraguayan Civil War
Paraguayan Civil War (1922)
Paraguayan Civil War (1947)

See also
Insurgency in Paraguay